The 1992 LPGA Tour was the 43rd season since the LPGA Tour officially began in 1950. The season ran from January 30 to November 8. The season consisted of 34 official money events. Dottie Mochrie won the most tournaments, four. She also led the money list with earnings of $693,335.

There were eight first-time winners in 1992: Brandie Burton, Dawn Coe, Florence Descampe, Dana Lofland, Sherri Steinhauer, Kris Tschetter, Lisa Walters, and Jennifer Wyatt.

The tournament results and award winners are listed below.

Tournament results
The following table shows all the official money events for the 1992 season. "Date" is the ending date of the tournament. The numbers in parentheses after the winners' names are the number of wins they had on the tour up to and including that event. Majors are shown in bold.

Awards

References

External links
LPGA Tour official site
1992 season coverage at golfobserver.com

LPGA Tour seasons
LPGA Tour